Conor Kearney was a footballer and hurler from Co Kerry. He played during the 1980s and 90's

Club

He played football with Brick Rangers and also played hurling with Abbeydorney. He later Laune Rangers with whom he won and All Ireland Club Championship in 1996. He also played with Tralee side Na Gaeil towards the end of his career.

Underage

He also played with Kerry, winning a Munster Minor Football Championship in 1989 after playing in wins over Waterford and Cork. Kerry later lost to Offaly in the All-Ireland semi-final.

He later moved on to the Kerry Under 21 team. He won a Munster U21 medal in 1991 after wins over Waterford and Cork. Kerry overcame Meath in the All-Ireland final. The final was a repeat of the 1990 with Tyrone. Kerry suffered a heavy loss in the end as the Ulster side took the title.

He was underage again in 1992. He won a second Munster title after Kerry overcame Cork in the final. They suffered another heavy loss to Tyrone this time in the All-Ireland semi-final.

Senior

Kearney joined the Kerry senior team during the 1992/93 National Football League, playing in four games. He later played in the Munster championship when Kerry faced Cork. He came on as a sub as Kerry summer ended at the first hurdle.

References

External links
 https://web.archive.org/web/20090619122113/http://munster.gaa.ie/winning-teams/u21f_teams/
 https://web.archive.org/web/20090619121745/http://munster.gaa.ie/winning-teams/mf_teams/
 http://munster.gaa.ie/winning-teams/sfclub_teams/

Year of birth missing (living people)
Living people
Dual players
Abbeydorney hurlers
Brick Rangers Gaelic footballers
Kerry inter-county Gaelic footballers
Laune Rangers Gaelic footballers
Na Gaeil Gaelic footballers